Alonzo is a given name and surname. Alonzo may also refer to:

 Alonzo (play), a 1773 tragedy by John Home
 Alonzo, Kentucky, an unincorporated community
 Alonzo, a French rapper